Matías Ezequiel Dituro (born 8 May 1987) is an Argentine naturalized Chilean professional footballer who plays as a goalkeeper for Chilean club Universidad Católica.

He played top-flight football in Peru with CNI; Bolivia with Club Aurora, Jorge Wilstermann and Bolívar; Chile with Antofagasta and Universidad Católica; and in Spain with Celta Vigo.

As a goalkeeper, Dituro scored six professional goals. Four were penalty kicks, one a long kick from his own penalty area, and the sixth a header.

Club career

Early years
Born in Bigand in the Caseros Department of Santa Fe Province, Dituro began his career with Independiente and had a loan with Almagro. After playing for CNI in the Peruvian Primera División in 2010, he signed for Alavés of the Spanish Segunda División B in January 2011. That August, he moved to Celta Vigo on a one-year deal with the option of one more, being assigned to the B-team.

Dituro's place at third-tier Celta B was taken by youngster Rubén Blanco halfway through the season. He had one call-up for the first team in Segunda División in the penultimate game of the season on 27 May 2012, a 2–1 win at Gimnàstic de Tarragona. He returned to his homeland later that year, at Douglas Haig in the Primera B Nacional, and Guillermo Brown of the Torneo Federal A in July 2013.

Bolivia and Chile
Dituro then moved to the Bolivian Primera División, with Cochabamba-based Aurora and Jorge Wilstermann. He scored four penalties for the latter.

Following a spell in the Chilean Primera División with Antofagasta, Dituro returned to Bolivia in January 2017 with Bolívar. On 23 April, he scored from his own goal at the end of a 3–1 home win over San José. He went back to Chile in January 2018 on loan to Universidad Católica for a US$250,000 fee.

On 8 July 2021, Dituro joined La Liga side Celta de Vigo on loan for the 2021–22 season with an option to make the deal permanent. He was signed by compatriot Eduardo Coudet to replace the retired Sergio Álvarez, and started ahead of Blanco who was still at the club. In his second match for Celta on 23 August, he saved a penalty from Rubén García and kept a clean sheet as the club drew 0–0 with Osasuna.

Personal life
In February 2023, he got Chilean nationality by residence.

Career statistics

Club

Honours
Bolivar
 Primera División de Bolivia: 2017–AP, 2017–CL

Universidad Católica
Primera División de Chile: 2018, 2019, 2020, 2021
Supercopa de Chile: 2019, 2020

Individual
 Primera División's El Gráfico Golden Ball: 2020

References

External links

 
 
 

1987 births
Living people
People from Caseros Department
Association football goalkeepers
Argentine footballers
Argentine expatriate footballers
Argentine emigrants to Chile
Naturalized citizens of Chile
Chilean footballers
Club Atlético Independiente footballers
Club Almagro players
Colegio Nacional Iquitos footballers
Deportivo Alavés players
Celta de Vigo B players
Club Atlético Douglas Haig players
Guillermo Brown footballers
Club Aurora players
C.D. Jorge Wilstermann players
C.D. Antofagasta footballers
Club Bolívar players
Club Deportivo Universidad Católica footballers
RC Celta de Vigo players
Argentine Primera División players
Primera Nacional players
Peruvian Primera División players
Segunda División B players
Segunda División players
Torneo Federal A players
Bolivian Primera División players
Chilean Primera División players
La Liga players
Expatriate footballers in Peru
Expatriate footballers in Spain
Expatriate footballers in Bolivia
Expatriate footballers in Chile
Argentine expatriate sportspeople in Peru
Argentine expatriate sportspeople in Spain
Argentine expatriate sportspeople in Bolivia
Argentine expatriate sportspeople in Chile
Sportspeople from Santa Fe Province